Pregadio is a surname. Notable people with the surname include:

Fabrizio Pregadio (born 1957), Italian Sinologist and translator
Roberto Pregadio (1928–2010), Italian composer, conductor, and television personality

Italian-language surnames